Corythucha marmorata, the chrysanthemum lace bug, is a species of lace bug in the family Tingidae. It is found in Central America and North America.

References

Further reading

External links

 

Tingidae
Insects described in 1878